The Gothic altarpiece of Santes Creus is an altarpiece painted by Guerau Gener and Lluís Borrassà between 1407 and 1411. It is one of the key works of the International Gothic altarpieces in Catalonia, created for the Santes Creus Monastery. The MNAC museum retains the Nativity, crowned by the figure of St. John the Evangelist, and the Resurrection of Christ, while the rest of the tables are kept in one of the chapels of the cathedral of Tarragona. The altarpiece was commissioned to Pere Serra but apparently died without starting it. Guerau Gener, a connoisseur of València international Gothic, replaced him, but his untimely death made Lluís Borrassà, one of the major figures in the painting of the first international Catalan Gothic, to complete the project.

References

External links
  The artwork at Museum's website

Catalan paintings
Paintings in the collection of the Museu Nacional d'Art de Catalunya
1400s paintings
1410s paintings
Nativity of Jesus in art
Altarpieces